La Possession is a 1929 French film directed by Léonce Perret.

Cast 
 Francesca Bertini - Jessie Cordier
 Pierre de Guingand - Marquis Serge de Châvres
 Gil Roland - Max Brignon
 Jeanne Aubert - Passerose 
 André Nox - Duc de Chavres
 Marguerite de Morlaye - Bianca

External links 

French films based on plays
French silent films
French black-and-white films
Films directed by Léonce Perret
1920s French films